Jesús 'Txutxi' Aranguren Merino (26 December 1944 – 21 March 2011) was a Spanish football defender and coach.

His 13-year professional career was solely associated with Athletic Bilbao, with which he played in nearly 400 official games, winning two Copa del Rey trophies.

Playing career
Born in Portugalete, Biscay, Aranguren joined Basque Country giants Athletic Bilbao's youth system at the age of 16, from neighbouring Sestao Sport Club. On 18 November 1962, one month shy of his 18th birthday, he made his first-team – and La Liga – debut, playing the entire 2–1 away win against Córdoba CF, and finished his first season with 18 matches.

Aranguren would be an important defensive unit for Athletic in the following 11 campaigns, starting in 225 of the 229 games he appeared in the league and helping to win two Copa del Rey trophies. After no appearances in 1974–75 he retired from football, aged only 30; during his spell with the club he scored five own goals to another legendary teammate, José Ángel Iribar.

Coaching career
Aranguren started managing at his only club, being in charge of its youth teams first then the reserves. Subsequently, he spent nine seasons in the second division, starting with another local side, Deportivo Alavés, and achieving promotion in 1987 with CD Logroñés, a first-ever for the Riojans; also under his guidance, they managed to retain their status the following season.

After one year with Sporting de Gijón, Aranguren managed Athletic Bilbao during fifteen games in the 1991–92 season, following the dismissal of his former club teammate Iñaki Sáez. With six wins, two draws and seven losses, he eventually placed the team out of the relegation zone (14th position).

In 1994, Aranguren returned to Alavés, winning promotion in his first year and staying with the team for a further two seasons, the second ending on 16 February 1997 following a 2–3 home loss against RCD Mallorca. In the following years, he worked mainly with Alavés' B-team; however, on 29 April 2003, he replaced Mané at the helm of the main squad for the final seven games of the campaign, which ended in top-flight relegation.

Death
Aranguren retired from management in 2005, to care for his sick wife. On 21 March 2011, whilst accompanying her to a checkup in the Cruces Hospital in Barakaldo, he succumbed to a heart attack, dying at the age of 66.

Honours

Player
Athletic Bilbao
Copa del Generalísimo: 1969, 1972–73; Runner-up 1965–66, 1966–67

Manager
Alavés
Segunda División B: 1994–95

See also
List of one-club men

References

External links

1944 births
2011 deaths
People from Portugalete
Sportspeople from Biscay
Spanish footballers
Footballers from the Basque Country (autonomous community)
Association football defenders
La Liga players
Athletic Bilbao footballers
Spain youth international footballers
Spain amateur international footballers
Spanish football managers
La Liga managers
Segunda División managers
Segunda División B managers
Athletic Bilbao B managers
Deportivo Alavés managers
Recreativo de Huelva managers
Deportivo de La Coruña managers
CD Logroñés managers
Sporting de Gijón managers
Athletic Bilbao managers
Levante UD managers
FC Cartagena managers